This is a list of people who have served as Custos Rotulorum of Carmarthenshire.

 Richard Devereux 1543 – bef. 1558
 Sir Thomas Jones bef. 1558 – bef. 1559
 Sir Henry Jones bef. 1562–1586
 Sir Thomas Jones 1586 – bef. 1594
 Edward Dunlee bef. 1594–1595
 Sir Thomas Jones 1595–1604
 Sir Henry Jones 1605 – bef. 1637
 Sir Henry Jones, 1st Baronet 1637–1644
 Richard Vaughan, 2nd Earl of Carbery 1644–1646
 Interregnum
 Sir John Lloyd, 1st Baronet Mar–July 1660
 Richard Vaughan, 2nd Earl of Carbery 1660–1686
 John Vaughan, 3rd Earl of Carbery 1686–1713
 Charles Paulet, 3rd Duke of Bolton 1714–1735
 Sir Nicholas Williams, 1st Baronet 1735–1745
 Thomas Williams of Edwinsford (brother of Nicolas Williams, 1st Baronet) 1746–1762
 George Rice 1762–1779
For later custodes rotulorum, see Lord Lieutenant of Carmarthenshire.

References

Institute of Historical Research - Custodes Rotulorum 1544-1646
Institute of Historical Research - Custodes Rotulorum 1660-1828

Carmarthenshire